This is a list of commemorative postage stamps issued by the India Post between 1961 and 1970.

1961

1962

1963

1964

1965

1966

1967

1968

1969

1970

References

External links
 Catalogue of Indian Postage Stamps

Postage stamps of India
India